The Bondi Icebergs Swimming Club is an Australian winter swimmers club, located at the southern end of Bondi Beach in Sydney, New South Wales. The swimming club was established in 1929 and has a small museum on the first floor. A defining characteristic of the Club is a rule that to maintain membership it was mandatory that swimmers compete on three Sundays out of four for a period of five years.

Water Polo by the Sea is held there every year by Australian Water Polo, with the Australia men's national water polo team taking on various international all star teams.

The Bondi Icebergs Club was a location for a Jim Beam advertisement.

The Bondi Icebergs Winter Swimming Club compete against Cronulla Polar Bears Winter Swimming Club, South Maroubra Dolphins Winter Swimming Club, Clovelly Eskimos Winter Swimming Club, Maroubra Seals Winter Swimming Club, Coolangatta Surf Life Saving Club, Coogee Penguins Winter Swimming Club, Bronte Splashers, Wollongong Whales and Cottesloe Crabs in the Winter Swimming Association of Australia Championships.

See also

Surf lifesaving
Surf Life Saving Australia
List of Australian surf lifesaving clubs

References

External links
 

1929 establishments in Australia
Sports clubs established in 1929
Surf Life Saving Australia clubs
Sporting clubs in Sydney
Australian swim teams
Swimming clubs
Winter swimming
Swimming venues in Australia
Bondi, New South Wales
Water polo venues in Australia